The Moorside Edge is a steeply sloping area of moorland at  just north of Slaithwaite and about  west of Huddersfield in the Kirklees District of West Yorkshire. It descents from the relatively flat summit of Pole Moor into the valley of the River Colne.

Just above the edge itself is the Moorside Edge transmitting station.

Geography of Kirklees